The Ukrainian Cup 2005–06 is the 15th annual edition of Ukraine's football knockout competition, known as the Ukrainian Cup. The winner of this competition was Dynamo Kyiv.

Team allocation
Seventy teams entered the competition

Distribution

Round and draw dates
All draws held at FFU headquarters (Building of Football) in Kyiv unless stated otherwise.

Competition Schedule

Preliminary round 
The Preliminary Round took place on August 8, 2005.

First round 
The First Round took place on August 13, 2005. However, the match between PFC Olexandria and Dnipro Dnipropetrovsk took place on August 14.

Second round (1/16) 
The Second Round took place on September 21, 2005.

Third Round (1/8) 
The third round matches took place on October 26, 2005.

Quarterfinals 
In the quarterfinals, there were four pairs of teams, and each pair plays a single match. The match schedule stretched from November 13, 2005 to December 14, 2005.

Semifinals 
The semifinals took place on March 22, 2006 and April 12, 2006. 

|}

Final

External links 
Ukrainian Cup 2005–06 

Ukrainian Cup seasons
Cup
Ukrainian Cup 2005–06